Shan may refer to:

People
Shan (surname), or 单 in Chinese, a Chinese surname
Shan, a variant of the Welsh given name usually spelled Siân
Occasionally used as a short form of Shannen/Shannon

Ethnic groups
Shan people, Southeast Asian ethnic group inhabiting Myanmar
Shan language
Dai people, also known as Shan, ethnic group in China
Shanrong (山戎), term for "mountain barbarian" in Shanxi, Hubei in northern China

Individuals
Shaan Shahid, Pakistani actor, model, writer and film director
MC Shan, rapper
Liu Shan, second emperor of Shu Han during the Three Kingdoms period.
Fu Buqi (宓不齊; Fu Pu-ch'i; born 521BC) who was accorded the title 'Count of Shan'

Places

China
Shaanxi, abbreviated as Shan (陕), province of the People's Republic of China
Shan County, Shandong (单县), county in Heze, Shandong, China
Shan County, Henan (陕县), now Shanzhou District of Sanmenxia city, a county in Sanmenxia, Henan, China
Shantou, or Shan (汕), a city in Guangdong, China
Shan (鄯), a region in Xinjiang Uyghur Autonomous Region 
Shan (剡), a river in the Zhejiang Province of China
Shan Hills, a region of Burma, China, and Thailand

Other places
Shan State of Burma (modern state)
Shan States of Burma (historical kingdoms)
Shan Hills, a region of Burma, China, and Thailand
Shan (鄯), ancient Western Regions (西域) to the west of China
山, shan, Chinese character (used in Chinese, Japanese and Korean) for "mountains" or "mountain range"
Mount Shani or Gora Shan, a mountain in the Caucasus

Other uses
Shan Foods, a brand of Pakistani cuisine spice mixes
Insect from Shaggai, or Shan, a fictional alien race in the writings of Ramsey Campbell
 The Shan Horse, a horse breed from the Shan State of Myanmar

See also
Xiao (mythology), several creatures from Chinese mythology
Shaan (disambiguation)
Shani (disambiguation)

Language and nationality disambiguation pages